
Year 663 (DCLXIII) was a common year starting on Sunday (link will display the full calendar) of the Julian calendar. The denomination 663 for this year has been used since the early medieval period, when the Anno Domini calendar era became the prevalent method in Europe for naming years.

Events 
 By place 
 Byzantine Empire 
 Emperor Constans II launches an assault against the Duchy of Benevento (Southern Italy). Taking advantage of the fact that Lombard king Grimoald I is engaged against Frankish forces from Neustria, Constans disembarks at Taranto, and besieges Lucera and Benevento.
 Constans II visits Rome for 12 days (the only emperor to set foot in Rome for two centuries), and is received with great honor by Pope Vitalian. Constans gives the order to strip buildings, including the Pantheon, of their ornaments, which will be carried back to Constantinople. 
 Constans II moves the imperial court from Constantinople to Syracuse. He tries to stop the Arab conquest of Sicily, and restores Rome as seat of the Byzantine Empire. Constans strips sacred altar vessels from churches all over Rome. 
 May 8 – Battle of Forino: The Byzantine army, led by Constans II, is defeated by the Lombards under Romuald I. He seizes Taranto and Brindisi, receiving military aid from the Bulgar Alcek horde, who are settled in the area of Ravenna.

 Britain 
 King Oswiu of Northumbria invades Pictland (modern Scotland). He establishes overlordship of, at least, the Southern Pictish sub-kingdoms of Fortriu and Fib (and possibly Circinn).
 A brief outbreak of plague hits Britain (approximate date).

 Asia 
 June 5 – In China, the Daming Palace becomes the government seat and royal residence of Emperor Gao Zong of the Tang Dynasty.
 Battle of Baekgang: Korean Baekje forces and their Japanese allies are defeated in a naval battle, by a joint Silla–Tang coalition.
Mount Fuji is estimated to have been first climbed by a monk in this year.

 By topic 
 Religion 
 Wine, bishop of Winchester, moves the episcopal see north again to Dorchester.

Births 
 Nasr ibn Sayyar, Arab general (d. 748)
 Ōtsu, Japanese prince and poet (d. 686) 
 Song Jing, chancellor of the Tang Dynasty (d. 737) 
 Yamanobe, Japanese princess (approximate date)
 Zhang Yue, chancellor of the Tang Dynasty (d. 730)

Deaths 
 Ago, duke of Friuli (approximate date) 
 Cunibert, bishop of Cologne (approximate date)
 Gartnait IV, king of the Picts (approximate date)
 Guaire Aidne mac Colmáin, king of Connacht (Ireland)
 Gwisil Boksin, Korean general of Baekje (Korea)

References

Sources